José Mariano de la Cruz de la Riva Agüero y Sánchez Boquete, Marquess of Montealegre de Aulestia (3 May 1783 – 21 May 1858) was a soldier, politician, and historian who served as the 1st President of Peru and 2nd President of North Peru. He was the first Head of State who had the title of President of the Republic.

He wanted to finish the Peruvian independence process only by Peruvians' own efforts organized by the Segunda Campaña de Intermedios, but failed. His disagreements with Congress and Bolivar's Arrival determined an end of his mandate and his deportation, first to Guayaquil and then to Europe, where he lived until he came back to America in 1828. He went first to Chile and then returned to Peru in 1833 and was elected deputy to a Convention that reincorporated him in the army with the title of Grand Marshal.

Supporter of President Luis José de Orbegoso, he was plenipotentiary minister in Chile and President of the Nor Peruvian State in the Peru-Bolivian Confederation. After the end of that political entity, he went again to Ecuador in 1843.

Early life and political career 
Riva Agüero was born in Lima in 1783. His father was José de la Riva Agüero y Basso della Rovere, a Spanish aristocrat of Italian origin and a matrilineal descendant of the Della Rovere family. His mother was María Josefa Sánchez Boquete y Román de Aulestia, a member of the ancient Spaniard nobility established in Lima and a sister of the Marquis de Montealegre de Aulestia. 

Although the first representatives of the de la Riva Agüero family were established in Peru since the 17th century, his father just settled down himself in the last quarter of the 18th century. He was part of the tribunal which accompanied visitador José Antonio de Areche to Peru in 1777 and was then appointed Superintendent of the Royal Mint of Peru (Real Casa de Moneda), a post he occupied until his death.

Riva Agüero spent his childhood in Lima, where he received his early education and a commission as lieutenant of the Regiment of the Nobility Corps in 1796 when he was thirteen years old. He was sent to Spain to complete his military education under the supervision of influential paternal relatives (one of his uncles was Minister of the Consejo de Indias and another one lieutenant general of the Army), however he decided to abandon his career as well as his subsequent legal studies to travel to France. In 1805, he was appointed Knight of the Order of Charles III and confirmed in 1807.

Returned to Madrid, Riva Agüero participated in the wars against the Napoleonic invasion. Moved by the nationalist ardor caused by the Napoleonic invasion in 1808, he was involved in some early actions against the French in Guipuzcoa and Burgos and then joined the forces of General Echevarri in Cordoba participating in the Battle of Alcolea Bridge.

In 1809, aware of the fact that his military career in the Spanish Army was limited due in part to the legal restriction that prevented American Spaniards to accede to high offices, he decided to initiate a career in the colonial administration. He was appointed Minister Judge of the Royal Mint of Peru, accountant of the Court of Auditors (Tribunal Mayor de Cuentas) and Judge of the Royal Lottery of Lima (Real Ramo de Suertes). That same year, his father died and Riva Agüero decided to return to Lima. By that time, he was already known for his adhesion to separatist ideals, so the Spanish authorities in Buenos Aires, Montevideo and Mendoza tried to prevent him entering Peru. 

In Lima, Riva Agüero participated actively in various conspiracies for the Peruvian independence, the reason for which he was placed under strict surveillance by order of Viceroy Abascal. In 1813, his first work on the state of the Court of Auditors of Lima was destroyed by the Viceroy and Riva Agüero tried and placed under house arrest. Next year, he participated in the failed conspiracy of Quiroz and Pardo de Zela to take the government of Lima, in the conspiracy of Gómez and in the conspiracy of 1819. 

José de San Martín named him prefect of Lima in 1822. Upon the departure of San Martín and the ensuing social instability in the country, Andrés de Santa Cruz revolted against the Peruvian Congress on February 26, 1823 and forced it to elect Riva Agüero as President. Riva Agüero proclaimed himself "President of Peru", the first to use such title.

During his short government, he suffered the entry of Spanish troops into the capital and the departure of the government towards a new installation at the port of Callao. Under this situation, Riva Agüero lost all support of the Peruvian Congress, which awaited anxiously the arrival of Simón Bolívar. He was later deposed by Antonio José de Sucre. Sucre was succeeded by José Bernardo de Torre Tagle until the arrival of Simón Bolívar. Congress had been waiting for the Venezuelan "Liberator" to come to Peru and help to consolidate the Independence of the country, and was more than willing to grant him all necessary powers.

Fearing the loss of leadership, Riva Agüero sought to conciliate with the Viceroy to prevent the arrival of Bolívar, only to be arrested and accused of high treason. He was subsequently exiled to Chile. There he wrote the Memorias y documentos para la Historia de la Independencia del Perú y causas del mal éxito que ha tenido ésta (Memories and documents for the history of the independence of Peru and causes for its failure so far), one of the most important sources for the period.

During the short-lived Peru-Bolivian Confederation Riva Agüero supported Mariscal Andrés de Santa Cruz, and became president of the Republic of North Peru in 1838. After its collapse, he retired from public life until his death in 1858.

He had five children with Caroline-Arnoldine de Looz-Corswarem. His eldest son was José de la Riva-Agüero y Looz-Corswarem.

Conspiracy in Lima 

During his time in Spain, he joined an American lodge that worked for the independence of America. He came back to Peru after he was appointed as accountant and conservative judge in the area of luck and lotteries in the Tribunal Mayor de Cuentas de Lima (1810), returned to Peru, via Buenos Aires, decided to support the independence movement. During his trip, he avoided harassment from the authorities: he was briefly arrested in Montevideo but; in Buenos Aires, he had to flee furtively after realizing that they were going to return him to Spain. Something similar happened in the city of Mendoza.

Already established in Lima, he was associated with various groups of patriots and maintained active correspondence with those of Chile and Buenos Aires, which had already been installed Governing Boards. He ran Lima's Lodge from home, located at Santa Teresa (now fifth block of Jirón Puno) or the house of the Count of Vega del Ren, in the street of Botica San Pedro (now fourth block of Jirón Miró Quesada). He was involved in almost all Lima conspiracies, which were closely monitored by the authorities and eventually persecuted. However,  the intervention of powerful friends and relatives saved him.

In 1816 he wrote a Manifestación histórica y política de la revolución de América, published anonymously in Buenos Aires in 1818 in which he exposed 20 causes justifying the insurgency against the colonial regime.

Contact with San Martín 
Riva Agüero was then in intensive contacts with José de San Martín, who after securing the independence of Chile planned to go to Peru. He sent valuable data on the situation of the royalist forces and helped define the plan of operations of the Army of the Andes to attack the central coast of Peru to penetrate the Alto Peru. For all these reasons, the figure of Riva Agüero was instrumental in achieving the emancipation of Spanish America.

At that time, a messenger of San Martin  was captured with correspondence that was addressed to Riva Agüero and other Lima patriots in April 1819. The Viceroy Joaquín de la Pezuela then ordered the confinement of Riva Agüero in Tarma (central highlands of Peru) while preparing a boat to take him to Spain, but the legal appeal and the disruption caused by the arrival of San Martin during his Freedom Expedition led such a severe measure to be abandoned.

Even in such conflict, Riva Agüero continued laboring for the cause of independence, convincing many officers to desert the royal troops. Indeed, he was one of those who influenced over Numancia Battalion's celebrated change to the patriot ranks. Similarly, he promoted the guerrilla organization to sever accesses in Lima. He also helped to produce the schism and disagreement among the Spanish generals themselves and help to infiltrate the royal army with double agents.

See also 
 Peru–Bolivian Confederation

References

Further reading 
 Higgins, J., ed. (2014). The Emancipation of Peru: British Eyewitness Accounts.

External links
 Riva-Aguero, José de la, 1783-1858 at Library of Congress

Writers from Lima
1783 births
1858 deaths
Freemasons
19th-century Peruvian historians
Peruvian male writers
Peruvian people of Spanish descent
Peruvian people of Italian descent
Peruvian Army officers
Presidents of Peru
People of the War of the Confederation
Marshals of Peru
Historians of Peru
Riva Agüero family